Gabriel Couto Caetano de Melo (born 23 June 2000), commonly known as Gabriel Melo, is a Brazilian footballer who currently plays for Dibba.

Career statistics

Club

Notes

References

External links
 

2000 births
Living people
Brazilian footballers
Brazilian expatriate footballers
Association football wingers
UAE Pro League players
UAE First Division League players
Barra Futebol Clube players
Al-Ittihad Kalba SC players
Dibba FC players
Expatriate footballers in the United Arab Emirates
Brazilian expatriate sportspeople in the United Arab Emirates